Gabriele Auber (born 20 February 1994) is an Italian diver who won a bronze medal at the 2019 Summer Universiade.

Biography
Auber is an athlete of the Gruppo Sportivo della Marina Militare.

See also
 Italy at the 2019 Summer Universiade

References

External links
 Gabriele Auber at FIN

1994 births
Living people
Italian male divers
Sportspeople from Trieste
Universiade medalists in diving
Universiade bronze medalists for Italy
Divers of Marina Militare
Medalists at the 2019 Summer Universiade
Medalists at the 2017 Summer Universiade
21st-century Italian people